Santa Maria Imbaro (locally Sanda Marmàre) is a comune and town in the province of Chieti in the Abruzzo region of Italy

References

Cities and towns in Abruzzo